Sukumar Pradhan (born October 1948 - October 2021) also known as S.K. Pradhan was a member of the Sikkim Legislative Assembly for two consecutive terms from 1984 to 1994 representing Central Pendam constituency from Sikkim Sangram Parishad.

Personal life
Eldest son of Sikkimese pro democracy leader Nahakul Pradhan and Naina Kumari Pradhan. He was born into the aristocratic Newar Taksari family. His paternal grandmother Kanti Pradhan was the granddaughter of Taksari Chandrabir Maskey of Pakyong, an erstwhile Sikkimese feudal lord of many estates in Sikkim.

Career
He was elected from Central Pendam constituency for two consecutive terms(1984 to 1994). In Government of Sikkim, he held several positions as chairman of Sikkim Livestock Development Corporation, chairman of Sikkim Housing and Development Board and Sikkim Distilleries.

Later he joined Sikkim Democratic Front and served in various capacities as treasurer, general secretary and senior vice president.

He died in Siliguri on 28 October 2021 at the age of 73.

Positions held
 1984-89 - MLA - Central Pendam Constituency 
 1989-1994 - MLA - Central Pendam Constituency

References

1948 births
2021 deaths
Sikkim MLAs 1985–1989
Sikkim MLAs 1989–1994